Local elections were held in Marilao, Bulacan, on May 13, 2013. The voters (Marileños) will elect for the elective local posts in the municipality: the mayor, vice mayor, and eight councilors.

Mayoral and vice mayoral election
Incumbent mayor Epifanio Guillermo is term-limited and the party nominates incumbent Vice Mayor Tito Santiago, which is also term-limited as well. The party also nominates incumbent councilor Alex Castro and run for mayor and vice mayor of Marilao, Bulacan, respectively, under the Liberal Party.

Henry Lutao of Barangay Lias will run with incumbent councilor Andre Santos as his running mate under the banner of the Nacionalista Party.

Lost councilor candidate JM-Jun Montaos will run independently

Results
The candidates for mayor and vice mayor with the highest number of votes wins the seat; they are voted separately, therefore, they may be of different parties when elected.

Mayoral and vice mayoral elections

Municipal Council election
Voting is via plurality-at-large voting: Voters vote for eight candidates and the eight candidates with the highest number of votes are elected.

References

2013 Philippine local elections
Elections in Marilao